Vredens barn (lit. Children of Wrath) is a 1979 novel by Swedish author Sara Lidman. It won the Nordic Council's Literature Prize in 1980.

References

1979 Swedish novels
Swedish-language novels
Nordic Council's Literature Prize-winning works